Yoon Do-hyun (born February 3, 1972) is a South Korean hard rock/folk rock singer, musician, and songwriter. He is the founder and lead vocalist of the Yoon Do-hyun Band (YB) since 1996. Yoon is also an MC on TV variety programs (notably Yoon Do-hyun's Love Letter) and a musical theatre actor.

Career
Yoon Do-hyun was born in Imjin-myeon (currently Munsan-eup) in Paju, Gyeonggi Province. He graduated from Munsan High School in 1991, and began working in 1993 around Paju's music circles as part of the band Jongyiyeon (종이연).

In 1994, Yoon released his debut solo album, In Front of the Post Office in Autumn (가을 우체국 앞에서). It produced the hit singles "Tarzan" and "Love Two," but the album did not receive much commercial success since dance music was trendy at the time.

Yoon formed the eponymously named Yoon Do-hyun Band in 1996, with himself on vocals, drummer Kim Jin-won, guitarist Yoo Byung-yeol, and bass guitarist Park Tae-hee. Later that year, Yoon played the lead role in Jungle Story, Kim Hong-joon's film that recounts the rise and fall of a fictitious, underground band. His bandmates also appeared in the film.

Its initial failure to break out led to the Yoon Do-hyun Band almost disbanding in 2000, and guitarist Yoo Byung-yeol left the band and was replaced by Huh Joon. Then in 2002, they gained fame with the World Cup cheer song "Oh! Pilseung Korea" (meaning "Victory Korea!"). With its explosive live performances and Yoon's powerful voice and frank personality onstage, the Yoon Do-hyun Band eventually became one of the foremost rock bands in South Korea, selling more than 2 million albums and doing more than 100 live concerts. It won music awards from Korea's three main broadcast stations KBS, MBC and SBS, and won the WPMA (World Peace Music Award) in 2003 for their activities in promoting human rights. Renamed YB in 2005, it was the first Korean band to ever tour Europe and had two sold-out concerts in New York City (Nokia Theater, B.B King Blues Club) in 2006. YB was the subject of two rockumentaries, Kim Tae-yong's On the Road, Two (2006) and Moon Cheung-heum's Flying Butterfly (2010). YB celebrated its 20th anniversary in 2015 with a series of sold-out concerts titled "20 Years Old."

Meanwhile, Yoon starred in stage musicals such as Jesus Christ Superstar, Hedwig and the Angry Inch, Gwanghwamun Sonata, and Once. He also hosted the popular music-talk show Yoon Do-hyun's Love Letter from April 2002 to November 2008.

As a solo artist, Yoon has released two albums and three EPs, including Difference (2005), Harmony (2009), and Singing Yoon Do-hyun (노래하는 윤도현, 2014).

In October 2021, it was announced that Yoon Do-hyun would participate in Sing Again 2 as the new judge for season 2.

Personal life
Yoon married musical theatre actress Lee Mi-ok on June 15, 2002. They have one daughter.

Discography

Studio albums

EPs

Singles

Collaboration in other albums

Acting

Musical theatre

Filmography

Variety show

Awards and nominations

See also
 YB (band)

References

External links
 YB at Dee Company 
 Yoon Do-hyun at ManiaDB 
 
 
 

1972 births
Living people
People from Paju
20th-century South Korean male singers
South Korean rock singers
South Korean folk rock singers
South Korean radio presenters
South Korean musicians
South Korean male musical theatre actors
South Korean male film actors
Korean Music Award winners
21st-century South Korean male singers
South Korean male singer-songwriters